"Gimme Some Lovin" is a song first recorded by the Spencer Davis Group. Released as a single in 1966, it reached the Top 10 of the record charts in several countries. Later, Rolling Stone included the song on its list of the 500 Greatest Songs.

Other artists have also recorded versions of the song; group singer Steve Winwood later recorded it live with Traffic and a rendition by the Blues Brothers reached number 18 on the main US singles chart.

Background

As recalled by bassist Muff Winwood, the song was conceived, arranged, and rehearsed in just half an hour. At the time, the group was under pressure to come up with another hit, following the relatively poor showing of their previous single, "When I Come Home", written by Jamaican-born musician Jackie Edwards, who had also penned their earlier number one hits, "Keep On Running" and "Somebody Help Me". The band auditioned and rejected other songs Edwards offered them, and they let the matter slide until, with a recording session looming, manager Chris Blackwell took them to London, put them in a rehearsal room at the Marquee Club, and ordered them to come up with a new song.

Personnel
The Spencer Davis Group:
 Steve Winwood – lead vocals, organ, piano, percussion
 Spencer Davis – rhythm guitar, vocals
 Muff Winwood – bass, vocals
 Pete York – drums

Chart performance and legacy

In 2004, Rolling Stone magazine ranked "Gimme Some Lovin'" at number 247 on its list of the 500 Greatest Songs of All Time. Winwood later recorded live versions of the song with Traffic for Welcome to the Canteen (1971) and The Last Great Traffic Jam (2005). In an album review for Welcome to the Canteen, AllMusic's William Ruhlmann wrote "the [set list] capper was a rearranged version of Steve Winwood's old Spencer Davis Group hit "Gimme Some Lovin'."

"Gimme Some Lovin'" has been recorded by several rock and other artists.  Pop artist Olivia Newton-John covered it for her 1978 album, Totally Hot, which an album reviewer called "as close to a drunken party as one will get on a Newton-John album". A performance for the musical comedy film The Blues Brothers (1980) "featur[es] an arrangement notable for the horn section that replaces Steve Winwood's rumbling organ work", according to critic Bret Adams. Released as single by Atlantic Records, it reached number 18 on Billboard magazine's Hot 100 chart. In 1990, British group Thunder recorded it for their debut album Backstreet Symphony. AllMusic writer Alex Henderson commented: "Another high point of this CD is an inspired cover of the Spencer Davis Group's 'Gimme Some Lovin',' which Thunder changes from blue-eyed soul/rock to straight-up hard rock."

References

External links
"Gimme Some Loving" by the Spencer Davis GroupPartial list of subsequent versions

1966 songs
1966 singles
The Spencer Davis Group songs
The Blues Brothers songs
Olivia Newton-John songs
Thunder (band) songs
RPM Top Singles number-one singles
Grammy Hall of Fame Award recipients
Songs written by Steve Winwood
Song recordings produced by Jimmy Miller
Fontana Records singles
United Artists Records singles
Atlantic Records singles